The 26th District of the Iowa Senate is located in northern Iowa, and is currently composed of Cerro Gordo, Chickasaw, Floyd, Howard, Mitchell, Worth, and Winneshiek Counties.

Current elected officials
Waylon Brown is the senator currently representing the 26th District.

The area of the 26th District contains two Iowa House of Representatives districts:
The 51st District (represented by Jane Bloomingdale)
The 52nd District (represented by Todd Prichard)

The district is also located in Iowa's 1st congressional district, which is represented by Ashley Hinson and Iowa's 4th congressional district, which is represented by Randy Feenstra.

Past senators
The district has previously been represented by:

James D. Wells, 1983–1988
Richard Running, 1989–1992
Paul Pate, 1993–1994
Mary Lundby, 1995–2002
Steve Kettering, 2003–2012
Mary Jo Wilhelm, 2013–2016
Waylon Brown, 2017–present

See also
Iowa General Assembly
Iowa Senate

References

26